The island governor of Saba is the representative on Saba, an island of the Netherlands, of the Dutch head of state (King Willem-Alexander), under responsibility of the minister of the interior and kingdom relations. The governor is appointed by the monarch for a period of six years. The island governor chairs the meetings of the Executive Council and the Island Council, and is the head of the public entity. The current island governor is Jonathan Johnson. The acting island governor is Shamara Nicholson-Linzey.



Functions
According to the Wolbes the powers of the island governor are:

Section 172 
 The Island Governor will see to:
 timely preparation, adoption and implementation of the policy of the public entity and of the resulting decisions, as well as proper attuning between those involved in such preparation, adoption and implementation;
 proper cooperation of the public entity with the other public entities and other governments;
 the quality of procedures in the area of citizen participation;
 careful handling of notices of objection;
 careful handling of complaints by the island government.
 The Island Governor will otherwise promote proper attendance to the affairs of the public entity.

Section 173
 The Island Governor will represent the public entity in and out of court.
 The Island Governor may delegate the representation to a person appointed by him.

Section 174
 The Island Governor will be entrusted with maintaining public order.

List

Island Territory of the Windward Islands
Until 1 April 1983 Saba coexisted with St. Eustatius and Sint Maarten under the Island Territory of the Windward Islands. The lieutenant governor of this island territory was represented on Saba by an administrator.

Island Territory of Saba

Public Entity Saba

References 
worldstatesmen.org

Saba, List of Heads of Government of
Lieutenant Governors of Saba